Rajin-guyŏk is a North Korean district on Rason in the Sea of Japan (East Sea of Korea) in the North Pacific Ocean on the northeast tip of North Korea. It is in the Kwanbuk region and location in the south of Rason. North of it lies the North Korea–Russia border.

Transport
Rajin Station is the terminus of both the P'yŏngra and Hambuk lines of the Korean State Railway.

The Khasan–Rajin railway was opened in 1959, connecting the port  of  Rajin with the Russian Khasan on the Tumen River; the river is the natural North Korea–Russia border. The railway had been renewed between 2008-2013. Coal transport from North Korea to Khasan on the renewed line started in summer 2014. As the track was built using four rails both Russian broad gauge as well as Korean standard gauge trains can access the port of Rajin.

A new Russian-North Korean terminal was commissioned in Rajin. Along with cargo transshipment and storage, the terminal makes it possible to organize coal magnetic cleaning and coal separating. Thus, the pilot part of the project aimed at the reconstruction of the Trans-Korean railway from Russia's Khasan to the seaport of Rajin just over the border.

References

Rason
Districts of North Korea